The 2020 Rhode Island Senate elections took place as part of the biennial United States elections. Rhode Island voters elected all 38 state senators. State senators serve two-year terms in the Rhode Island Senate. A primary election on September 8, 2020 determined which candidates appear on the November 3 general election ballot. All the members elected will serve in the Rhode Island General Assembly.

Summary

Overview

By district

Sources

Retiring incumbents
4 incumbent Senators (all Democrats) are not seeking reelection in 2020:

Donna Nesselbush, District 15
Erin Lynch Prata, District 31 (Seeking appointment to the Rhode Island Supreme Court)
Adam Satchell, District 9
James Sheehan, District 36

Defeated incumbents

In primary
4 incumbent Senators (all Democrats) sought reelection but were defeated in the September 8 primary. The defeated were all beaten by progressive challengers who saw the incumbents as too conservative for the Democratic party.

William Conley Jr., District 18
Betty Crowley, District 16
Mark McKenney, District 30
Harold Metts, District 6

Predictions

Detailed results

District 1
Democratic primary

No other candidate filed for District 1.
General election

District 2
No other candidate filed for District 2.

District 3
No other candidate filed for District 3

District 4
Democratic primary

General election
No other candidate filed for District 4.

District 5
Democratic primary

General election
No other candidate filed for District 5.

District 6
Democratic primary

General election

District 7
No other candidate filed for District 7.

District 8

District 9
Democratic primary

General election

District 10

District 11
No other candidate filed for District 11.

District 12
No other candidate filed for District 12.

District 13
No other candidate filed for District 13.

District 14

District 15
Democratic primary
Herbert Weiss

General election
No other candidate filed for District 15.

District 16
Democratic primary

General election
No other candidate filed for District 16.

District 17

District 18
Democratic primary

General election
No other candidate filed for District 18.

District 19
No other candidate filed for District 19.

District 20
No other candidate filed for District 20.

District 21
No other candidate filed for District 21.

District 22
Democratic primary

General election

District 23

District 24
No other candidate filed for District 24.

District 25
No other candidate filed for District 25.

District 26

District 27

District 28

District 29
Democratic primary

General election

District 30
Democratic primary

General election
No other candidate filed for District 30.

District 31
Democratic primary

Republican primary

General election

District 32
No other candidate filed for District 32.
General election

District 33
No other candidate filed for District 33.

District 34

District 35

District 36
Democratic primary

General election

District 37

District 38
No other candidate filed for District 38.

See also
2020 Rhode Island elections
2020 Rhode Island House of Representatives election
2020 United States elections

References

Senate election
Rhode Island Senate
Rhode Island Senate elections